This is a list of current monarchs of the Arabian Peninsula.

It includes the ruling houses of those states which are monarchies: Bahrain, Oman, Qatar, Saudi Arabia and the each of the seven emirates which make up the United Arab Emirates.

The Ruling families and their current head (and therefore Ruler) are: 
 Al Khalifa family in Bahrain: Hamad bin Isa Al Khalifa
 Al Maktoum family in Dubai: Mohammed bin Rashid Al Maktoum
 Al Mualla family in Umm Al Quwain: Saud bin Rashid Al Mualla
 Al Nahyan family in Abu Dhabi: Mohamed bin Zayed Al Nahyan
 Al Nuaimi family in Ajman: Humaid bin Rashid Al Nuaimi III
 Al Qasimi family in Ras Al Khaimah: Saud bin Saqr Al Qasimi
Al Qasimi family in Sharjah: Sultan bin Muhammad Al Qasimi and Ras Al Khaimah: Saud bin Saqr Al Qasimi
 Al Sabah family in Kuwait: Nawaf Al Sabah
Al Said family in Oman: Haitham bin Tariq Al Said
Al Saud family in Saudi Arabia: Salman of Saudi Arabia
Al Sharqi family in Fujairah: Hamad bin Mohammed Al Sharqi
 Al Thani family in Qatar: Tamim bin Hamad Al Thani

References

Middle Eastern royal families
Arabian Peninsula
History of the Middle East
Arabian Peninsula